Bouchain is a commune in the Nord department in northern France.

It lies halfway between Cambrai and Valenciennes. Bouchain, seat of the early medieval County of Ostrevent, was taken by Arnulf I, Count of Flanders, in the 10th century and eventually subsumed into the County of Hainaut.

During the War of the Spanish Succession, when the town was fortified, Bouchain was besieged twice. On 12 September 1711 it was seized from the French after a 34 day siege by the Grand Alliance led by the Duke of Marlborough. It was again besieged, and recaptured by French forces, on 19 October 1712 after an 18 day siege.

Population

International relations
It is twinned with Halesworth and Eitorf.

Heraldry

See also
 Communes of the Nord department

References

Communes of Nord (French department)
Vauban fortifications in France
French Hainaut